REvolution: Live! is a live CD/DVD released by the American band Lynch Mob in 2006. The album/DVD was recorded during the REvolution tour. For this release, Michael Frowein was replaced by Chas Stumbo (ex-Earshot)

Track listing

Personnel
Robert Mason – vocals
George Lynch – guitars
Anthony Esposito – bass guitar
Chas Stumbo – drums

References

Lynch Mob (band) albums
2006 live albums
Cleopatra Records live albums